is a Japanese Paralympic judoka. She represented Japan at the 2016 Summer Paralympics held in Rio de Janeiro, Brazil and she won one of the bronze medals in the women's 57 kg event.

References

External links 
 

Living people
1990 births
Place of birth missing (living people)
Japanese female judoka
Judoka at the 2016 Summer Paralympics
Medalists at the 2016 Summer Paralympics
Paralympic bronze medalists for Japan
Paralympic medalists in judo
Paralympic judoka of Japan
20th-century Japanese women
21st-century Japanese women